This is a list of assassinations of the Kurdish-Turkish conflict, usually carried out by the Kurdistan Workers' Party (PKK) or the security forces of Turkey.

See also 
 List of arrested mayors in Turkey – mostly Kurdish parties representatives

References 

History of the Kurdistan Workers' Party
Kurdish–Turkish conflict (1978–present)
Kurdish
Kurdish